The 2018 Women's Euro Beach Soccer Cup was the third edition of the Women's Euro Beach Soccer Cup, an annual European beach soccer championship for women's national teams, organised by Beach Soccer Worldwide (BSWW). The event was revealed on 28 March 2018.

Six nations took part in a three-day competition, hosted in the same location as the 2017 edition, Nazaré, Portugal, between 6 and 8 July, alongside stage 2 of the men's 2018 Euro Beach Soccer League.

England were the defending champions, but failed to progress pass the group stage, ultimately finishing in fourth place. The championship was claimed by Russia, who won the title at their first attempt.

Teams
All six teams from the previous edition returned, except for Greece, who were replaced by Russia.

1

Superscript key: 1. Teams making their debut

Venue

All matches took place at the Estádio do Viveiro on Praia de Nazaré (Nazaré Beach).

The stadium had recently been undergoing redevelopment, increasing its capacity from 1,600 to 2,200. However, one part of the stadium was still awaiting upgrades, meaning the new capacity figure was yet to be fully reached.

Draw
The draw took place on June 12, 2018, at BSWW's headquarters in Barcelona. The six teams were split into two groups of three.

Two teams were seeded and automatically allocated to the groups: England, as reigning champions, were allocated to position A1 and Switzerland, as runners up in the last edition, were allocated to B1. The unseeded nations were then drawn to accompany them in the two groups, with placement of the nations alternating back and forth between Groups A and B as each team was drawn out in turn.

Group stage
The teams compete in a round robin format. The winners of the groups proceed to contest the final. The respective group runners-up and third placed nations play each other in consolation matches to decide third through sixth place in the final standings.

Matches are listed as local time in Nazaré, WEST (UTC+1)

Group A

Group B

Play-offs

Fifth place play-off

Third place play-off

Final

Awards
After the final, the following awards were presented.

Winners trophy

Individual awards

Goalscorers
5 goals
 Anastasia Gorshkova

4 goals

 Natalia Zaitseva
 Andrea Miron

3 goals

 Alba Mellado
 Andrea Morger
 Marina Fedorova

2 goals

 Sarah Kempson
 Ramona Birrfelder
 Alina Grueter
 Vanessa Meyer
 Nicole Heer
 Lauren Cheshire
 Nathalie Schenk
 Natalia de Francisco Gomez
 Anna Cherniakova

1 goal

 Molly Clark
 Nadine Bazan
 Aaike Verschoor
 Aafke de Hoek
 Katie James
 Elena Ivashkina
 Deborah Kehrli
 Michaela Culova
 Marketa Matejkova
 Carla Morera
 Bouchra Moudou
 Veronika Pychova
 Ana Pascual
 Lorena Asensio
 Aleksandra Samorodova
 Gemma Hillier
 Aneta Jungova
 Joelle de Bondt

Own goals

 Aleksandra Samorodova (vs. Switzerland)
 Andrea Morger (vs. Netherlands)

Source

Final standings

References

External links
Women's Euro Beach Soccer Cup Nazaré 2018, at Beach Soccer Worldwide
European Cup Women's Teams 2018, at Beach Soccer Russia (in Russian)

Women
International association football competitions hosted by Portugal
Beach soccer in Portugal
2018 in beach soccer
2018 in Portuguese sport
July 2018 sports events in Portugal